Toby Wright is an American record producer and mixing engineer who has worked with artists such as Alice in Chains, Metallica, Sevendust and Korn.

Credits

Producer
3rd Strike - Lost Angel
8stops7 - In Moderation
Alice in Chains - Alice in Chains
Alice in Chains - Unplugged
Arcane Saints - Turning the Tide
Biohazard - Reborn in Defiance
Brad Gillis – Gilrock Ranch
Brighton Rock - Love Machine
Brown Brigade - Into the Mouth of Badd(d)ness
Burn to Shine - Signs (of what’s to come)
Chris Whitley - Terra IncognitaChris Whitley - Long Way AroundCraving Lucy - Craving LucyDeity's Muse - TBAFear Factory - TransgressionFishbone - Fishbone 101: Nuttasaurusmeg Fossil Fuelin' the FonkayGrade 8 - Grade 8Jerry Cantrell - Boggy DepotKiss - Carnival of Souls: The Final SessionsKorn - Follow the LeaderThe Letter Black - Hanging On by a ThreadLinea 77 - Horror VacuiLinea 77 - 10Machina - To Live and Die in the Garden of EdenMemento - BeginningsThe Nixons - FomaThe Nixons - The NixonsO.Y.D. - Deep BreathOzzy Osbourne - Prince of DarknessPrimus - RhinoplastySevendust - HomeSlayer - Divine InterventionSlayer - Soundtrack to the ApocalypseSonic Syndicate - We Rule the NightSoulfly - PrimitiveTantric - TantricTantric - After We GoTantric - The End BeginsTaproot - WelcomeTaproot - Blue-Sky ResearchVillebillies - VillebilliesMixing
3 - The End Is Begun3 Doors Down - The Better Life3rd Strike - Lost Angel40 Below Summer - Invitation to the DanceAlice in Chains - "What the Hell Have I"
Alice in Chains - Jar of FliesAlice in Chains - Alice in ChainsAlice in Chains - UnpluggedAlice in Chains - "Get Born Again"
Biohazard - Reborn in DefianceBoy Hits Car - Boy Hits CarBrad Gillis - Gilrock RanchBrian Wilson - Brian WilsonBrown Brigade - Into the Mouth of Badd(d)nessChris Whitley - Din of EcstasyChris Whitley - Terra IncognitaChris Whitley - Long Way AroundCorrosion of Conformity - DeliveranceCraving Theo - Craving TheoDepswa - Distorted American DreamFear Factory - TransgressionFuture Leaders of the World - RevealGrade 8 - Grade 8GZR - OhmworkG.I.V.E. - UNNATURALIn Flames - A Sense of PurposeJerry Cantrell - Boggy DepotJibe - Epic Tales of Human NatureKiss - Carnival of Souls: The Final SessionsMachine Head - "From This Day"
Meldrum - Blowin' Up the MachineMushroomhead - XXOutlett - Full CircleO.Y.D. - Deep BreathOysterhead - The Grand Pecking OrderQueensrÿche - Hear in the Now FrontierThe Parlor Mob - "Everything You're Breathing For"
The Parlor Mob - "The Kids"
The Parlor Mob - "Hard Times"
Primus - RhinoplastyPrimus - AntipopReal McCoy - "Sleeping with an Angel"
Rehab - Southern DiscomfortRobben Ford - Talk to Your DaughterSammy Hagar - Red VoodooSix Feet Under - Death RitualsSlayer - Divine InterventionStone Sour - Stone SourSwitched - Subject to ChangeSwitched - Ghosts in the MachineTarja Turunen - The SeerTarja Turunen - "Enough"
Third Eye Blind - BlueTrey Anastasio - Trey AnastasioUltraspank - Progress (Ultraspank album)''

References 
General

Specific

American record producers
Living people
Kiss (band) personnel
Year of birth missing (living people)